Gerhard Watzke (24 September 1922 – 12 June 2021) was an Austrian rower. He competed at the 1948 Summer Olympics in London with his brother Kurt in the men's coxless pair where they were eliminated in the semi-finals.

References

1922 births
2021 deaths
Austrian male rowers
Olympic rowers of Austria
Rowers at the 1948 Summer Olympics
European Rowing Championships medalists